Zorro is a musical with music by the Gipsy Kings and John Cameron, a book by Stephen Clark and Helen Edmundson, and lyrics by Stephen Clark. It is inspired by the 2005 fictional biography Zorro, the first original story of the pulp hero Zorro, written by Chilean author Isabel Allende (itself a prequel to the events of the original Zorro story which is the 1919 novella The Curse of Capistrano by Johnston McCulley, but excludes the mute butler Bernardo). It also contains numerous references to earlier Zorro-related works, especially the 1998 film The Mask of Zorro. The original musical did a trial run tour which proved to be successful, and led to a transfer to the West End (which included some minor changes such as the recasting of the roles of Luisa and Ramon).

The musical originally opened at the Congress Theatre in Eastbourne with a five night run between 4–8 March 2008, before moving to the West End in July.

The musical began previews at the Garrick Theatre in London on 2 July 2008, after the first few were cancelled due to technical problems.  The official opening was 15 July 2008. Christopher Renshaw directed and Rafael Amargo choreographed. The cast featured Matt Rawle as Zorro/Diego De La Vega, Emma Williams as Luisa, Adam Levy as Ramon, Lesli Margherita as Inez, Nick Cavaliere as Sergeant Garcia, and Jonathan Newth as Don Alejandro De La Vega.

Zorro ran at the Garrick for almost nine months, with its final performance on 14 March 2009.

A new concert version, was produced by 'Take Two Theatricals' in February 2020. It was performed for one night at Cadogan Hall, in London. The cast was led by two of the original cast members, Leslie Margherita (who won an Olivier award for her role), and Emma Williams who was nominated for hers. This production had new compositions, orchestrations and arrangements by John Cameron. There was no set, however the actors had additional props and costumes. George Reeve designed and created the video projections. Lesli and Emma both said in interviews 'they were thrilled to be returning to this musical, and working together again, after all these years.'

Aria Entertainment began a revival of the show at the Hope Mills Theatre in Manchester in March 2020, but the run was cut short after just two performances due to the COVID-19 pandemic. The show was transferred to London in 2022, but its scheduled reopening on 12 March was again delayed. The show reopened at the Charing Cross Theatre on 2 April, running until May 28.

Synopsis

Prologue
Deep inside a cave, a band of gypsies stop to rest for the night, while dancing and singing, they listen eagerly as their leader tells them about an old gypsy myth - the infamous story of the legendary hero, Zorro.

Act I
Don Diego de la Vega, a wealthy young caballero, is sent away from his California home by his father, Don Alejandro, to school in Spain. He is forced to leave his childhood love Luisa, who is also being sent away by Diego's father. At the same time, Don Alejandro announces that Diego and Luisa's childhood friend Ramon shall become captain of the army, which pleases both Diego and Luisa.

Later, in Spain, Diego has run away from school and joined a band of gypsies who perform in the backstreets of the city ("Baila Me"). He is their star attraction, and after showing several tricks to an enthralled audience, he sees Luisa. Luisa persuades Diego to return to California to stop Ramon, who has become a tyrant. Inez, another gypsy and evidently Diego's lover, is not pleased to see Luisa and decides that she and all the other gypsies must accompany them. In California, Diego finds that Ramon has stripped the people of their rights and has put himself in charge ever since Don Alejandro "died." However, unbeknownst to everyone, Don Alejandro is not dead and is being held captive by Ramon. Ramon demonstrates his cruelty by sentencing three men to death for stealing; the men had added rocks to their sacks of grain to gain extra money for their hungry families. As the men are taken away, their women angrily declare their hatred of Ramon and his treatment of the people ("Libertad").

After witnessing the cruelty of his old friend, and with the help of Inez (the only one who knows his plans), Diego adopts a heroic alter ego, which the people name "El Zorro" (though Diego wanted to be called "El Puma" instead), to defend the people of the pueblo ("Hope"). At the same time, to keep his identity secret, he presents himself to Ramon as an idiot of no real threat. He offers himself to Ramon as a personal servant, a move that angers Luisa, who believes that she brought Diego back for nothing.

The following day, the three men prepare to be hanged. As they are led to the gallows, Luisa and the women of the pueblo lament over the way the pueblo used to be and express hope that things will get better ("In One Day"). Before the noose can be tightened, Zorro makes a name for himself by saving the prisoners. Zorro swings in spectacularly out of nowhere and manages to appear almost simultaneously as Zorro and Diego, so that no one will suspect Diego.

After another spectacular rescue, Zorro flees from Ramon's guards and find himself in Luisa's room, having walked in on her while she is in the bath. Embarrassed, he lets it slip that he knows her name, but his identity is kept safe from her, and she begins to fall in love with Zorro, just as Diego has always been in love with her ("Falling").

Meanwhile, the gypsies cause a stir in the pueblo by drinking and dancing together ("Bamboleo/There's a Tale"), enticing Ramon's cowardly but warm-hearted second-in-command Sergeant Garcia. Flirting and joking with Garcia, Inez soon finds a new admirer, and Garcia tries his best to act strong and brave like Zorro. However, Inez still has eyes for Diego and finds Garcia merely entertaining. Ramon, initially intrigued by the idea of free wine, eventually turns against the gypsies and their radical ways and tries to prevent their activities. He finally attempts to exert his power by forcing himself upon Luisa, the woman he lusts after but who hates everything that he has become. Zorro appears just in time to save Luisa and tricks Ramon into accidentally admitting that Don Alejandro is still alive. To show that he will always be watching him, Zorro forces Ramon to his knees and carves his signature "Z" into Ramon's chest, as Ramon screams in agony and anger.

Act II
The second act opens with the band of gypsies from the prologue reappearing on stage and performing a large song and dance routine. ("Entrada")

When the storyline continues, Ramon reveals the full extent of his injury: he is permanently scarred with the mark of Zorro. The gypsies and citizens mock him, and he angrily declares a curfew and that anyone out after the curfew will be shot. The crowd protests ("Freedom"). Inez tells Luisa that it is too dangerous for her to stay in Los Angeles; Luisa says that she knows a place where Ramon can never find her.  Ramon orders the guards to shoot into the crowd. The people flee, leaving Inez and Ramon alone. She tells Ramon that his empire is crumbling around him and that soon his greed will consume him ("Bamboleo (Reprise)"). Ramon leaves in denial, but her words have a great effect on him.

Diego tries to advise Garcia on how to express his love for Inez, but when she arrives, Garcia becomes embarrassed and runs off. Diego enquires about Luisa's whereabouts. Inez tells him and also admits that she understands that Diego loves Luisa. Diego, dressed as Zorro, finds the cave where Luisa is hiding. Luisa confesses her feelings to Zorro, and the two dance outside the cave together ("Serenade"). The dance ends with Diego kissing Luisa but then pulling away. Luisa asks him why he's so afraid of his feelings; outside the cave, Diego sadly confesses that he wants to be with Luisa but is afraid that he risks putting her life in danger ("A Love We'll Never Live").

The following day, Garcia tries to impress Inez ("One More Beer"). Ramon, still distressed by Inez's words, goes to confession; he soon notices the priest is actually Zorro, who is trying to find out where Ramon is keeping Don Alejandro. Ramon sets a trap for Zorro, but Zorro manages to escape. Luisa goes to the gypsy camp where Inez transforms her into a gypsy ("Djobi Djoba"). Ramon bursts in and arrests Luisa. Inez calls Garcia a coward because he does nothing to stop Ramon.

Luisa is about to be executed by a firing squad when Zorro, accompanied by several other men dressed as Zorro, fights off the guards. Ramon puts a knife to Inez's throat and tries to make Zorro choose between Luisa and Inez, but Inez throws Ramon to the ground. She tells Ramon that the love between Zorro and Luisa is a love that he can never know. Ramon produces a pistol from his pocket and shoots Inez. A heartbroken Zorro surrenders and is dragged away by the guards as Ramon forces Luisa to agree to marry him. As Ramon leaves with Luisa, the gypsies discover Inez's body and mournfully carry her away.

In his prison cell, Diego laments his failure to protect the people and blames himself for the suffering of the ones he loves ("Hope (Reprise)"). Garcia arrives and, admitting his cowardice, tells Zorro that he can take him to Don Alejandro. Meanwhile, Luisa is dressed by attendants for her wedding to Ramon. She wishes that she could have known the true identity of Zorro ("The Man Behind the Mask") and laments that in order to protect her love, she must sacrifice it as well as her happiness.

As the wedding begins, Zorro arrives, but this Zorro is revealed to be Don Alejandro, who confronts Ramon about his cruelty. An emboldened Garcia and the other guards turn against Ramon, and Don Alejandro orders Ramon to be arrested. But Ramon says that if they dare to arrest him, he will kill Luisa. The wedding proceeds, but just before Luisa gives her vows, the real Zorro swings into the chapel.  During the ensuing sword fight with Ramon, Zorro reveals his true identity to Ramon and asks him to stop fighting, saying that they are brothers. Ramon appears to agree but then draws a small knife. Diego evades the blade and causes Ramon to fall on his own knife. Ramon is fatally wounded and dies with his final thoughts being him, Diego, and Luisa as children.

Diego is distressed by what he has done, when Luisa and Don Alejandro reenter the room. Luisa, seeing that Zorro is unmasked, begs him to show her his face. Reluctantly he does so, and Luisa is shocked by the discovery that Zorro is Diego, but still declares that she loves him. The two kiss and embrace.  All rejoice ("Fiesta").

Musical numbers

 Act I
 "Flamenco Opening" – Gypsies
 "Baila Me" – Diego, Inez and Gypsies
 "Libertad" – Women of the Pueblo
 "Hope" – Diego
 "In One Day" – Luisa and the Women of the Pueblo
 "Falling" – Luisa
 "Bamboleo" / "There's a Tale" – Inez and Gypsies

 Act II
 "Entrada" – Gypsies
 "Freedom" – Inez, Citizens and Gypsies
 "Bamboleo" (Reprise) – Inez
 "Serenade" – Instrumental (The dance between Diego and Luisa)
 "A Love We'll Never Live" – Diego and Luisa
 "One More Beer" – Garcia, Inez and the Women of the Pueblo
 "Djobi Djobi" – Inez and Luisa
 "Hope" (Reprise) – Diego
 "Man Behind the Mask" – Luisa
 "Fiesta" – All

Principal characters and original cast
Don Diego de la Vega/Zorro – Matt Rawle.  He is the son of Don Alejandro, who initially heads the pueblo. He adopts a heroic alter ego to save the people of the pueblo who are being punished under Ramon's cruel leadership.
Luisa – Emma Williams.  Luisa grows up with Diego and Ramon.  She falls in love first with Diego and then Zorro, not knowing his true identity.
Ramon – Adam Levy. Diego's childhood friend. Ramon is jealous of the feelings Luisa has for Diego.  He is made captain of the army and seizes power.
Inez – Lesli Margherita.  The gypsy queen, Inez travels around the backstreets of Barcelona performing with Diego, with whom she falls in love.
Sergeant Garcia – Nick Cavaliere.  Military servant to Ramon. He is cowardly, but likable.  He falls in love with Inez. He is based on the comic antagonistic character from Disney's 1950s live action television series. 
Don Alejandro de la Vega – Jonathan Newth.  He is Diego's father, and the rightful leader of the Pueblo.

Critical reception
Zorro opened at the Garrick Theatre in London to almost entirely favourable reviews.  The Flamenco-based score and choreography were especially praised, as were the fight scenes. Michael Billington of the Guardian wrote, "The show may not be high art but it's great fun and brings a refreshingly different, Hispanic sound to the jaded world of West End musicals." He also noted, “The show is popular theatre that actually delivers the goods.” Michael Coveney of What's On Stage wrote, “An onstage flamenco fiesta that sets feet tapping and blood racing round the stalls.” Charles Spencer of The Daily Telegraph referred to Zorro as, “An insanely enjoyable musical.”

In its preview, the Evening Standard stated that whether the show becomes a hit or flop, "an eclectic combination of talents and influences will make Zorro the musical memorable." The play extended its contract into 2009.

Closing
Zorro the musical ended its West End run on the 14th of March 2009.  Since closing in London, Zorro has appeared in other countries such as France, Japan, China, Korea, the Netherlands, Russia, Bulgaria, Israel, and Brazil. Worldwide the show has grossed more than $70 million to date in ticket sales and earned several awards and nominations including the Laurence Olivier Awards for Best Actor for the show's star, Matt Rawle and for Best Supporting Performance in a Musical for Lesli Margherita.

International productions
In 2014, original star Lesli Margherita said that plans were in place to open a production of Zorro in New York in 2015.

Chadwick School piloted the first North American High School production of Zorro from February 25–28, 2015 in Palos Verdes Peninsula, CA.

The Italian theatrical company Compagnia Teatrale I Saltafoss will produce the first Italian version of “Zorro” from February 2021 in Milan.
The new show will be directed by Adriano Tallarini.
The Italian translation of book and lyrics will be edited by Matteo Magnaghi.

Notes
On the 17th of December 2008, the cast of Zorro performed on the Royal Variety Performance at the London Palladium. They did a medley of three songs from the show: "Bamboleo"; "Hope"; and ""Djobi Djoba".
The original cast recording was released in February 2009 and is currently available in stores.

Awards and nominations

Original London production

Recording chart positions

References

External links
Matt Rawle official website
Official website
High Performance: Bryan Donaldson, Aerial Director & Rigging
The Gipsy Kings: Zorro rides to the rumba flamenca
Why Isabel Allende agreed to produce Zorro: The Musical
Manchester Evening News article
"The Big Interview: Christopher Renshaw", The Official London Theatre Guide, on 9 July 2008

Helen Edmundson
2008 musicals
West End musicals
Zorro
Musicals based on novels